Ōnahau Bay is a large bay in Queen Charlotte Sound / Tōtaranui, New Zealand, just north-east of Grove Arm and meeting it at Houhou Point.

Naming
The meaning of the name Ōnahau is unclear. On the Western side of the bay is a hill called Ōnahau, either the bay's namesake or named for it. The name is also used for Ōnahau River & Little Ōnahau River in Te Tai o Aorere / The Tasman District.

Fence Bay
Fence Bay is 1 of 3 bays that sit in the back of Ōnahau Bay, along with Waterfall Bay and Mistletoe Bay. It was named for a fence that climbed a steep border between the farms of Vogel and Gullery in the middle of the 20th century.

Mistletoe Bay
Mistletoe Bay is 1 of 3 bays that sit in the back of Ōnahau Bay, along with Waterfall Bay and Fence Bay. Mistletoe is likely a reference to one of Aotearoa New Zealand's 9 native mistletoes, the most likely culprits being Peraxilla tetrapetala (pirirangi/pikirangi), Peraxilla colensoi (pirita/pirinoa), and Alepis flavida (pirita/pirinoa), as they commonly grow in beech forests like the Nothofagus solandri (tawairauriki/tawhairauriki) forests historically found along Tōtaranui / Queen Charlotte Sound.

Waterfall Bay
Waterfall Bay is 1 of 3 bays that sit in the back of Ōnahau Bay, along with Mistletoe Bay and Fence Bay. The bay is home to at least one magnificent waterfall, from which it draws its name. The bay is home to pūrātoke glow-worms, bioluminescent plankton, and stingrays.

Torapapa Point
Torapapa Point is located on the eastern tip of Ōnahau Bay. The point was labelled "Toropapa Point" on maps until sometime between 1949 and 1959.

Dartmoor Bay
Dartmoor Bay is located near the western tip of Ōnahau Bay, just north of Houhou Point.

Dartmoor Bay derives its name from a cottage built there named Dartmoor owned by Mr Herbert Yelverton Monro. Herbert owned the Bankhouse run and station in the fork of the Wairau and Waihopai rivers in Marlborough. The Monro family has no known connection to Dartmoor in the United Kingdom.

Postman's Rock
Postman's Rock is a large rock just west of Torapapa Point. The rock is named for when the Tōtaranui / Queen Charlotte Sound mail-boat was a row boat and would deposit mail upon it for the Sounds' residents to row out & pick up. Alternatively Post Office Rock.

References

Bays of the Marlborough Region
Marlborough Sounds